This is a list of national parks in Africa. The nature of the parks varies considerably not only between countries but also within some nations  -  the degree of protection, accessibility and type of environment for which it is intended to deliver protection. Some parks have been cleared of their original human population, others have always been essentially uninhabited, while yet others contain significant population centers.

National parks can be found in a large majority of African countries, being most numerous in Gabon, Kenya and Tanzania.  Some nations also have considerable areas designated as private parks, game reserves, forest reserves, marine reserves, national reserves and natural parks.  These are not included in the list below, even though some of these may resemble some national parks.  For more information on such zones, see the individual articles on each country.

Algeria

Ahaggar National Park
Belezma National Park
Chrea National Park
Djebel Aissa National Park
Djurdjura National Park
El Kala National Park
Gouraya National Park
Taza National Park
Tassili n'Ajjer National Park
Theniet El Had National Park
Tlemcen National Park

Angola

Bicauri National Park
Cameia National Park
Cangandala National Park
Iona National Park
Longa-Mavinga National Park
Luengue-Luiana National Park
Mupa National Park
Quiçama National Park

Benin
Pendjari National Park
W of the Niger National Park

Botswana

Chobe National Park
Kgalagadi Transfrontier Park
Makgadikgadi Pans National Park
Nxai Pan National Park

Burkina Faso

Arli National Park
Deux Balés National Park
Kaboré Tambi National Park (formerly Pô National Park), existing since 1976
W of the Niger National Park, existing since 1957

Burundi

Kibira National Park
Rusizi National Park
Ruvubu National Park

Cameroon

 Bakossi National Park
 Bénoué National Park

 Bouba Njida National Park
 Boumba Bek National Park
 Campo Ma'an National Park
 Deng Deng National Park
 Douala Edéa National Park

 Faro National Park
 Kimbi-Fungom National Park
 Korup National Park

 Lobéké National Park
 Mbam Djerem National Park
 Mbéré Valley National Park
 Mount Cameroon National Park

 Mpem and Djim National Park
 Nki National Park
 Takamanda National Park
 Tchabal Mbabo National Park
 Waza National Park

Cape Verde
Fogo National Park

Central African Republic

André Félix National Park
Bamingui-Bangoran National Park
Dzanga-Ndoki National Park
Mbaéré Bodingué National Park
St Floris National Park

Chad

Aouk National Park
Goz Beïda National Park
Manda National Park
Zakouma National Park

Comoros

Coelacanth National Park
Karthala National Park
Mitsamiouli Ndroude National Park
Mohéli National Park
Mount Ntringui National Park
Shisiwani National Park

Democratic Republic of the Congo

Garamba National Park
Kahuzi-Biéga National Park
Kundelungu National Park
Lomami National Park
Maiko National Park
Mangroves National Park
Okapi Wildlife Reserve (Note: This is not a national park.  This is a reserve with core protection and multi-use areas.)
Salonga National Park (North and South sections)
Upemba National Park
Virunga National Park

Republic of the Congo

Conkouati-Douli National Park
Nouabalé-Ndoki National Park
Ntokou-Pikounda National Park
Odzala-Kokoua National Park
Ougoue Lekiti National Park

Côte d'Ivoire

Assagny National Park
Banco National Park
Comoé National Park
Îles Ehotilés National Park
Marahoué National Park
Mount Nimba National Park
Mont Péko National Park
Mont Sângbé National Park
Taï National Park

Djibouti

Day Forest National Park
Djibouti National Park
Yoboki National Park

Egypt

 Gabal Elba National Park
 Lake Burullus Protectorate
 Lake Qarun Protectorate
 Nabq Protected Area
 Ras Muhammad National Park
 Saint Katherine Protectorate
 Sannur Valley Cave Protectorate
 Siwa Oasis
 Taba Protected Area
 Wadi Allaqi Biosphere Reserve
 Wadi El Gamal National Park
 Wadi El Rayan Protectorate
 White Desert National Park
 Gilf Kebir National Park

Equatorial Guinea

 Altos de Nsork National Park
 Monte Alén National Park
 Pico Basilé National Park

Eritrea
 Dahlak Marine National Park
 Semenawi Bahri National Park

Eswatini

Hlane Royal National Park

Ethiopia

Abidjatta-Shalla National Park
Alitash National Park
Arsi Mountains National Park
Awash National Park
Bale Mountains National Park
Bejimiz National Park
Borena National Park
Chebera Churchura National Park
Dhati-Welel National Park
Didessa National Park
Gambela National Park
Geralle National Park
Gibe Sheleko National Park
Kafta-Shiraro National Park
Loka-Abaya National Park
Mago National Park
Maze National Park
Mao-Komo National Park
Nechisar National Park
Omo National Park
Simien Mountains National Park
Yangudi Rassa National Park

Gabon

Akanda National Park
Batéké Plateau National Park
Birougou National Park
Crystal Mountains National Park
Ivindo National Park
Loango National Park
Lopé National Park
Mayumba National Park
Minkébé National Park
Moukalaba-Doudau National Park
Mwangné National Park
Pongara National Park
Waka National Park

The Gambia

Abuko National Park
Bijilo National Park
Kiang West National Park
Niumi National Park
River Gambia National Park

Ghana

Bia National Park
Bui National Park
Digya National Park
Kakum National Park
Kalakpa Game Production Reserve
Mole National Park
Nini-Suhien National Park

Guinea

Badiar National Park
Haut Niger National Park

Guinea-Bissau

Boé National Park
Cantanhez Forest National Park
João Vieira and Poilão Marine National Park
Cufada National Park
Dulombi National Park
Orango National Park
Varela National Park

Natural Parks
Cacheu River Mangroves Natural Park

Kenya

Aberdare National Park
Amboseli National Park
Arabuko Sokoke National Park
Central Island National Park
Chyulu Hills National Park
Hell's Gate National Park
Kisite-Mpunguti Marine National Park
Lake Nakuru National Park
Malindi Marine National Park
Malka Mari National Park
Marsabit National Park
Meru National Park
Mombasa Marine Park
Mount Elgon National Park
Mount Kenya National Park
Mount Longonot National Park
Nairobi National Park
Ol Donyo Sabuk National Park
Ruma National Park
Saiwa Swamp National Park
Samburu National Reserve 
Sibiloi National Park
Tsavo East National Park and Tsavo West National Park
Watamu Marine National Park

Lesotho

Sehlabathebe National Park
Ts'ehlanyane National Park

Liberia

Sapo National Park
Gola Forest National Park
Kpo Mountains
Grand Kru-River Gee
Bong Mountain
Foya National Park
Gbi National Park
Nimba West

Libya

Abughilan National Park
El-Kouf National Park
Karabolli National Park
El Naggaza National Park
Rajma National Park
Sirman National Park (Surman)

Madagascar

Amber Mountain National Park
Analamazaotra National Park
Andohahela National Park
Andringitra National Park
Ankarafantsika National Park
Baie de Baly National Park
Bemaraha National Park
Isalo National Park
Kirindy Mitea National Park
Lokobe National Park
Mantadia National Park
Marojejy National Park
Masoala National Park
Midongy du sud National Park
Namoroka National Park
Ranomafana National Park
Tsimanampetsotse National Park
Sahamalaza National Park
Zahamena National Park
Zombitse-Vohibasia National Park

Malawi

Kasungu National Park
Lake Malawi National Park
Lengwe National Park
Liwonde National Park
Nyika National Park

Mali

Bafing National Park
Boucle du Baoulé National Park
Kouroufing National Park
Wongo National Park

Mauritania

Banc d'Arguin National Park
Diawling National Park

Mauritius

 Black River Gorges National Park
 Bras d'Eau National Park
 Islets National Park

Morocco

 Al Hoceima National Park
 Gulf of Khnifiss National Park
 Haut Atlas Oriental National Park
 Ifrane National Park
 Iriqui National Park
 Khenifra National Park
 Merdja Zerga Biological Reserve
 Souss-Massa National Park
 Talassemtane National Park
 Tazekka National Park
 Toubkal National Park

Mozambique

Banhine National Park
Bazaruto National Park
Gorongosa National Park
Limpopo National Park (part of the Great Limpopo Transfrontier Park)
Magoe National Park
Quirimbas National Park
Zinave National Park

Namibia

Ai-Ais/Richtersveld Transfrontier Park (see also  Fish River Canyon and Ai-Ais Hot Springs)
Bwabwata National Park
Dorob National Park
Etosha National Park
Hardap Recreation Resort
Mangetti National Park
Mudumu National Park
Nkasa Rupara National Park previously Mamili National Park
Namib-Naukluft National Park
Skeleton Coast National Park
Waterberg National Park

Niger

W of the Niger National Park

Nigeria

Chad Basin National Park
Cross River National Park (Okavango and Oban sections)
Gashaka-Gumti National Park
Kainji National Park (Borgu and Zugurma sections)
Kamuku National Park
Okomu National Park
Old Oyo National Park
Yankari National Park

Rwanda

Akagera National Park
Gishwati-Mukura National Park
Nyungwe Forest National Park
Volcans National Park

São Tomé and Príncipe

Obo National Park

Senegal

Basse Casamance National Park
Isles des Madeleines National Park
Langue de Barbarie National Park
Djoudj National Bird Sanctuary
Niokolo-Koba National Park
Saloum Delta National Park

Seychelles

Curieuse Marine National Park
Morne Seychellois National Park
Praslin National Park
Ste. Anne Marine National Park

Sierra Leone

Gola Rainforest National Park
Outamba-Kilimi National Park
Western Area National Park (proposed)

Somalia

 Arbawerow National Park
 Baraako Madow National Park
 Buloburto National Park
 Bushbushle National Park
 Daalo Forest National Park
 Ga'an Libah National Park
 Hobyo National Park
 las'anod National Park
 Ras Hafun National Park
 Shoonto National Park
 Taleh-El Chebet National Park
 Zayla National Park

South Africa

 Addo Elephant National Park
 Agulhas National Park
 Ai-Ais/Richtersveld Transfrontier Park
 Augrabies Falls National Park
 Bontebok National Park
 Camdeboo National Park
 Golden Gate Highlands National Park
 Hluhluwe–Imfolozi Park
 Karoo National Park
 Kgalagadi Transfrontier Park
 Knysna National Lake Area
 Kruger National Park
 Mapungubwe National Park
 Marakele National Park
 Mokala National Park
 Mountain Zebra National Park
 Namaqua National Park
 Royal Natal National Park
 Table Mountain National Park
 Tankwa Karoo National Park
 Tsitsikamma National Park
 West Coast National Park
 Wilderness National Park

South Sudan

Bandingilo National Park
Boma National Park
Lantoto National Park
Loelle National Park
Nimule National Park
Shambe National Park
Southern National Park

Sudan

Dinder National Park
Jebel Hassania National Park
Radom National Park
Suakin Archipelago National Park

Tanzania

 Arusha National Park
 Burigi-Chato National Park
 Gombe Stream National Park
 Ibanda-Kyerwa National Park
 Katavi National Park
 Kigosi National Park
 Kilimanjaro National Park
 Kitulo National Park
 Lake Manyara National Park
 Mahale Mountains National Park
 Mikumi National Park
 Mkomazi National Park
 Nyerere National Park
 Ruaha National Park
 Rubondo Island National Park
 Rumanyika-Karagwe National Park
 Saadani National Park
 Saanane Island National Park
 Serengeti National Park
 Tarangire National Park
 Udzungwa Mountains National Park
 Ugalla River National Park

Togo

Fazao-Malfakassa National Park
Fosse aux Lions National Park
Kéran National Park

Tunisia

Bou-Hedma National Park
Boukornine National Park
Chaambi National Park
El Feidja National Park
Ichkeul National Park
Jebil National Park
Sidi Toui National Park
Zembra and Zembretta Islands National Park

Uganda

Bwindi Impenetrable National Park
Kibale National Park
Kidepo Valley National Park
Lake Mburo National Park
Mgahinga National Park
Mount Elgon National Park
Murchison Falls National Park
Queen Elizabeth National Park
Rwenzori National Park
Semuliki National Park

Zambia

Blue Lagoon National Park
Isangano National Park
Kafue National Park
Kasanka National Park
Lavushi Manda National Park
Liuwa Plain National Park
Lochinvar National Park
Lower Zambezi National Park
Luambe National Park
Lukusuzi National Park
Lusenga Plain National Park
Mosi-oa-Tunya National Park
Mweru Wantipa National Park
North Luangwa National Park
Nsumbu National Park
Nyika National Park, Zambia
Sioma Ngwezi National Park
South Luangwa National Park
West Lunga National Park
Lusaka National Park

Zimbabwe

Chimanimani National Park
Chizarira National Park
Gonarezhou National Park
Hwange National Park
Kazuma Pan National Park
Mana Pools National Park
Matobo National Park
Matusadona National Park
Nyanga National Park
Victoria Falls National Park
Zambezi National Park

Sortable Table

References

External links

National parks
Africa
National parks